The Jewish Museum and Tolerance Center opened in Moscow in November 2012. Construction of the museum is estimated to have cost $50 million.

Features  
This museum, dedicated to the complex history of Russian Jewry, uses personal testimony, archival video footage and interactive displays—all translated into Russian and English. The exhibitions are divided chronologically, helping visitors to understand the life of Jewish communities as they travelled across medieval Europe, settling in shtetls before moving to the cities. The role of Russian Jewry in public life in the late 19th and early 20th centuries is presented, as is the fate of Soviet Jews and the role of Jewish soldiers during World War II. Visitors learn about what it meant to be a "Soviet Jew" and finding out how and why so many left the USSR. Those expecting to find just a stark representation of pogroms, Holocaust, hardships and suffering will find Russian Jewish history presented as something much more complex, filled with both struggles and achievements. 

The museum is located in the northwestern Moscow neighborhood of Marina Roscha and can also be reached by taking tram no.19 from metro Novoslobodskaya.

History 

According to a May 2014 article by Alexis Zimberg in the Calvert Journal, the new Jewish Museum occupies the restored Bakhmetevsky Bus Garage. The 8,500-square-metre space is a landmark of the avant-garde 1920s. Designed by architect Konstantin Melnikov and structural engineer Vladimir Shukhov in 1926, the angled parallelogram building went from blueprint to structure in just one year. Vaulted ceilings and clean architectural angles echo an early Soviet mantra: ever higher, comrades, toward the radiant future. Melnikov and Shukhov even designed the interior lighting to resemble slanted rays of sunshine. In the 1990s, a fire left the garage decrepit and dysfunctional. Following mass restoration efforts it re-opened in 2008, initially to house the Garage Centre for Contemporary Culture.

In 2012, thanks to funding from oligarchs like Roman Abramovich and Viktor Vekselberg, from Jewish organisations like FEOR and Chabad Lubavitch—and with the support of President Vladimir Putin, who donated one month of his salary towards the construction—the site became home to the nation's largest Jewish museum.

Trustees 
The board of trustees of the museum includes Viktor Vekselberg, Gennady Timchenko, Len Blavatnik, Roman Abramovich, Vadim Moshkovich, Alex Lichtenfeld, Alexander Klyachin, Mikhail Gutseriev.

References

External links 

Museums in Moscow
History museums in Russia
Jewish museums
Jews and Judaism in Moscow
Cultural infrastructure completed in 2012